Kornilovskaya is a rural locality (a village) in Dvinskoye Rural Settlement of Verkhnetoyemsky District, Arkhangelsk Oblast, Russia. The population was 16 as of 2010.

Geography 
Kornilovskaya is located on the Sodonga River, 24 km southeast of Verkhnyaya Toyma (the district's administrative centre) by road. Isakovskaya is the nearest rural locality.

References 

Rural localities in Verkhnetoyemsky District